Tenno Dam  is a gravity dam located in Hyogo Prefecture in Japan. The dam is used for flood control. The catchment area of the dam is 4.6 km2. The dam impounds about 11  ha of land when full and can store 800 thousand cubic meters of water. The construction of the dam was started on 1968 and completed in 1980.

See also
List of dams in Japan

References

Dams in Hyogo Prefecture